The Cairo International Stadium, formerly known as Nasser Stadium, is an Olympic-standard, multi-use stadium with an all-seated capacity of 75,000. The architect of the stadium is the German Werner March, who had built from 1934 to 1936 the Olympic Stadium in Berlin. The engineering and construction supervision work of the stadium was performed by ACE Moharram Bakhoum. It is the 69th largest stadium in the world. Located in Nasr City; a suburb north east of Cairo, it was completed in 1960, and was inaugurated by President Gamal Abd El Nasser on 23 July that year, the eighth anniversary of the Egyptian Revolution of 1952. Zamalek SC and Al Ahly use the stadium for most of their home games.

Overview
The Stadium is located about 10 km west of Cairo International Airport and about 10 km (30 min) from downtown Cairo. In 2005, in preparation for the 2006 African Cup of Nations it underwent a renovation.

Cairo Stadium is known for its atmosphere and capacity. This was evident during the 2006 African Cup of Nations, which were held in Egypt. Cairo Stadium is a symbol of Egyptian football. Nearly all of the most important Egyptian matches are held there. It has also served as the main stadium of the 1991 All-Africa Games.

International football matches

2006 Africa Cup of Nations
The stadium was one of the venues for the 2006 Africa Cup of Nations.
The following games were played at the stadium during the 2006  Africa Cup of Nations:

2019 Africa Cup of Nations
The stadium was one of the venues for the 2019 Africa Cup of Nations.

The following games were played at the stadium during the 2019  Africa Cup of Nations:

Transport connections 
The stadium is located in Nasr City; a suburb north east of Cairo and can be reached by underground via the dedicated Cairo stadium subway station at line 3 and a Cairo Monorail station that will be opened in 2023, located in front of the stadium.

Stations nearby:

Gallery

Trivia
Hosts matches for the Egypt national football team.
Hosted many matches in the 2006 Africa Cup of Nations and the final which Egypt won against Ivory Coast 4–2 in penalties shootouts after a 0–0 draw in extra time.
It was updated to host the 2006 Africa Cup of Nations to meet the CAF standard stadiums making it all-seated which decreased the capacity from 85,000 to 75,000 and making blue zigzag highlights on the seats, later on the Olympic track was changed from blue to orange it was first seen on 14 November when Egypt faced Algeria in the 2010 FIFA World Cup qualification (CAF) which Egypt won 2–0.
It was one of the stadiums along with Borg El Arab Stadium and 5 other planned stadiums in the failed Egyptian bid to host the 2010 FIFA World Cup.

See also
 Cairo Stadium Indoor Halls Complex

References

External links

Website for Cairo Stadium
Photos at cafe.daum.net/stade
Photos at worldstadiums.com
Photos at fussballtempel.net

Zamalek SC
Football venues in Egypt
Athletics (track and field) venues in Egypt
Stadiums in Cairo
Egypt
Stadiums of the African Games
Sports venues completed in 1960
1960 establishments in Egypt
Football in Cairo
2019 Africa Cup of Nations stadiums